Anthophora crotchii is a species of anthophorine bee in the family Apidae named after George Robert Crotch. It is found in North America.

References

Further reading

 

Apinae
Articles created by Qbugbot
Insects described in 1878